Alvin D. Hall (born June 27, 1952) is an American financial adviser, author, and media personality.

Early life
Hall was born June 27, 1952, in Crawfordville, Florida, one of seven children to a family of farmers, day workers and fishermen. Interviewed on the BBC Radio 4 programme Midweek he said that his grandmother had told him he was "everything she had", something that helped him get through difficult financial decisions; she was also a great saver and gave him 50 dollars when he was heading to Yale.

He studied for a Bachelor of Arts in English at Bowdoin College and a Master of Arts in American literature at the University of North Carolina. After a period of unemployment and working as a college professor (teaching literature), he started to take an interest in finance.

Financial adviser
In 1990, Hall briefly lectured British stockbrokers in London in preparation for the NASD exams in the United States.

Hall has written books and articles on saving and investing as well as debt management. He presented Your Money or Your Life on BBC2 and has made various television and radio appearances, including as a panellist on Dave Gorman's Important Astrology Experiment and The Apprentice: You're Fired.

He also edits a money column in the UK's Reveal magazine. He has written Money Magic for the charitable organisation Quick Reads which encourages people to get back into the habit of reading. He was involved in Jamie Oliver's programme, Jamie's Dream School. On the programme, Hall taught the pupils mathematics.

Art collector

Hall is an art collector whose pieces include  works by Carroll Dunham, Victoria Morton, Tina Barney, Lee Friedlander, Carrie Mae Weems and Mel Kendrick.

Personal life
Hall is gay.

BBC Radio

Hall has presented several finance-related radio programmes for BBC Radio 4, which often broadcast in the period when Radio 4's personal finance programme Money Box is off-air.

Hall won the Wincott Award for business journalism for his 2006 documentary Jay-Z: From Brooklyn to the Boardroom in which he interviewed and profiled the entrepreneurial rap star Jay-Z.

2012
Alvin Hall in The Bonfire of the Vanities: Alvin Hall compares the New York City of Tom Wolfe's scathing 1980s satire with that of today.
Episode 1: The Bronx
Episode 2: Wall Street
Episode 3: Justice
Episode 4: English Journalists in New York
Episode 5: The Politics of the Case

2011
Poorer Than Their Parents: four programmes in which Alvin Hall assesses whether today's youth will be worse off than their parents.
Episode 1: Jobs
Episode 2: Pensions
Episode 3: Inheritance
Episode 4: Housing

2010
Alvin Hall's Generations of Money: Alvin Hall helps four different generations plan for an uncertain future and explores the economic bonds that tie them together

2009
The Money Grab: Alvin Hall examines the continuous rise in executive pay.

2008
Alvin Hall's World of Money: Alvin Hall asks where investors put their money during the time of a credit crunch.
Episode 1: Commodities
Episode 2: Wine
Episode 3: Art
Episode 4: Film
Episode 5: Property

2006
Jay-Z: From Brooklyn to the Boardroom: Profile of the rap entrepreneur Jay-Z.
 Alvin Hall's Secret Collection: Hall gains access to remarkable private art collections.

Tribute to Alistair Cooke
In Alistair Cooke's Footsteps, Hall's tribute to the Letter from America broadcaster, aired on the BBC World Service in November 2012.

References

External links
Official site
Alvin Hall On Small Spending
BBC raw Quick Reads - Money Magic by Alvin Hall
Alvin Hall's World of Money on Money box for BBC Radio 4
"Your money or your wife? Ask Alvin Hall", BBC, 18 June 2002.
Interview with asrecommended
Take Three Management
http://business.scotsman.com/topics.cfm?tid=1077&id=814932004}
https://web.archive.org/web/20090913102541/http://bettermoneyadvice.co.uk/finance/AlvinHallOnThe%20CreditCrunch

1952 births
African-American television personalities
American finance and investment writers
Wakulla High School alumni
Bowdoin College alumni
LGBT African Americans
Living people
Writers from Tallahassee, Florida
People from Crawfordville, Florida
African-American non-fiction writers
American non-fiction writers
American gay writers
21st-century African-American people
20th-century African-American people
21st-century LGBT people
African-American male writers
American male non-fiction writers